The galactic plane is the plane on which the majority of a disk-shaped galaxy's mass lies. The directions perpendicular to the galactic plane point to the galactic poles. In actual usage, the terms galactic plane and galactic poles usually refer specifically to the plane and poles of the Milky Way, in which Planet Earth is located.

Some galaxies are irregular and do not have any well-defined disk. Even in the case of a barred spiral galaxy like the Milky Way, defining the galactic plane is slightly imprecise and arbitrary since the stars are not perfectly coplanar. In 1959, the IAU defined the position of the Milky Way's north galactic pole as exactly RA = , Dec =  in the then-used B1950 epoch; in the currently-used J2000 epoch, after precession is taken into account, its position is RA , Dec . This position is in Coma Berenices, near the bright star Arcturus; likewise, the south galactic pole lies in the constellation Sculptor.

The "zero of longitude" of galactic coordinates was also defined in 1959 to be at position angle 123° from the north celestial pole. The Galactic Center is located at position angle 31.72° (B1950) or 31.40° (J2000) east of north.

See also 
 Galactic coordinate system
LHS 1815b example of  outside galactic plane exoplanet
Zone of Avoidance

External links 
 . See appendix for the numbers listed above.

Plane